Andoni Ituarte (born 20 August 1919, died between 2003 and 2013) was a Venezuelan cyclist. He competed in two events at the 1952 Summer Olympics.

References

External links
 

1919 births
Year of death missing
Venezuelan male cyclists
Olympic cyclists of Venezuela
Cyclists at the 1952 Summer Olympics
Sportspeople from Bilbao
Cyclists from the Basque Country (autonomous community)
Spanish emigrants to Venezuela
Venezuelan people of Basque descent
Pan American Games medalists in cycling
20th-century Venezuelan people
21st-century Venezuelan people
Medalists at the 1951 Pan American Games
Pan American Games bronze medalists for Venezuela